Douglas Township, Iowa can refer to one of the following townships in Iowa:

 Douglas Township, Adams County
 Douglas Township, Appanoose County
 Douglas Township, Audubon County
 Douglas Township, Boone County
 Douglas Township, Bremer County
 Douglas Township, Clay County
 Douglas Township, Harrison County
 Douglas Township, Ida County
 Douglas Township, Madison County
 Douglas Township, Mitchell County
 Douglas Township, Montgomery County
 Douglas Township, Page County
 Douglas Township, Polk County
 Douglas Township, Sac County
 Douglas Township, Shelby County
 Douglas Township, Union County
 Douglas Township, Webster County

See also
Douglas Township (disambiguation)
Iowa township disambiguation pages